Lucrezia Borgia is a 1912 Italian silent historical film directed by Gerolamo Lo Savio and starring Francesca Bertini in the title role of Lucrezia Borgia.

Cast
Francesca Bertini: Lucrezia Borgia
Vittoria Lepanto
Achille Vitti
Gustavo Serena
Giovanni Pezzinga: Cesare Borgia

References

Bibliography 
 Vito Attolini. Immagini del Medioevo nel cinema. EDIZIONI DEDALO, 1993.

External links 
 

1912 films
1910s historical drama films
Italian historical drama films
1910s Italian-language films
Italian silent short films
Films directed by Gerolamo Lo Savio
Films set in the 16th century
Cultural depictions of Cesare Borgia
Cultural depictions of Lucrezia Borgia
Italian black-and-white films
1912 drama films
Silent historical drama films